The 2022 Ottawa municipal election was held on Monday, October 24, 2022, to elect a mayor, city councillors, and trustees to the English and French public school boards and the English and French Catholic school boards in Ottawa, Ontario, Canada.

Incumbent Mayor Jim Watson did not run for re-election, citing his age as the reason behind his decision. This election was the first since the 1997 municipal election that an incumbent mayor or its equivalent did not run for re-election. The mayoral election was won by businessman and former journalist Mark Sutcliffe.

Candidate nominations opened on May 2 and closed on August 19. The election was held on the same day as the 2022 Ontario municipal elections.

Background
The outgoing city council was marred by a split between supporters of Mayor Jim Watson, known by detractors as the "Watson club", who represented mostly suburban wards, and opponents of the mayor's agenda, who mostly represent more urban wards. Some of Watson's more vocal critics on council have included Jeff Leiper, Catherine McKenney, Shawn Menard, Carol Anne Meehan and Diane Deans. This divide on council has shown up on a number of key issues during the term, such as a fight over who should chair the transportation committee, the Ottawa Police Services budget, a tax break for a proposed Porsche dealership in Vanier, whether to call for a judicial inquiry into the beleaguered Ottawa light rail system, how to deal with the Freedom Convoy occupation of the downtown core, and a vote on an unpopular addition to the Chateau Laurier.

Incumbents not running for re-election

Mayoral candidates

Registered candidates

Brandon Bay

Brandon Bay, 34, is a software developer.
Candidacy registered: May 2, 2022
Campaign website: 
Campaign slogan: Working Together.
Campaign slogan (French): Travaillons ensemble.
Policies: Build smart, affordable housing, invest in businesses and the future, market Ottawa to itself and the world

Zed Chebib
Zed Chebib, 67
Candidacy registered: August 10, 2022

Bob Chiarelli

Bob Chiarelli, 81, is the former Mayor (2001–2006) and Regional Chair (1997–2001), a former provincial cabinet minister under Dalton McGuinty and Kathleen Wynne, and the former MPP for Ottawa West—Nepean (2010–2018) and Ottawa West (1987–1997). He is the second cousin of outgoing city councillor for College Ward Rick Chiarelli.
Candidacy announced: December 10, 2021
Candidacy registered: May 2, 2022
Campaign website: 
Campaign slogan: Moving Ottawa Forward
Campaign slogan (French): Faire progresser la ville d'Ottawa
Policies: Repairing a 'fractured, toxic city council'; "instilling leadership" through hearing and responding to the needs of its citizens, getting the right people in the same room at the same time, assisting councillors in reaching their constituents’ goals, respecting all councillors regardless of their views, working in partnership with councillors, special interest groups; Getting value for tax dollars.

Bernard Couchman

Bernard Couchman, 43, is a businessman and perennial candidate. He ran for mayor in the 2014 and 2018 elections.
Candidacy registered: May 2, 2022
Campaign website: 
Campaign slogan: It's about you and I.
Campaign slogan (French): Il s'agit de toi et de moi.

Celine Debassige
Celine Debassige, 22, is an Indigenous activist and poet. She is Ojibwe and Dene, and described herself as a "radical socialist".
Candidacy registered: July 15, 2022

Gregory "Jreg" Guevara 

Gregory "Jreg" Guevara, 25, is a YouTuber and journalist who goes under the pseudonym Jreg (also JrEg) online. He writes for Capital Current, and formerly for The Charlatan and Apartment613. Guevara has denied that his campaign is a joke, instead referring to it as post ironic. He has stated that he is simultaneously a libertarian and a socialist.
Candidacy registered: July 22, 2022
Candidacy announced: August 9, 2022
Campaign website: 
Campaign slogan: OttaWall for all!!!

Nour Kadri
Nour Kadri, 48, is a professor and an expert-on-call at the University of Ottawa, president & CEO of Skyline Health Systems, and president of the Canadian Arab Federation.
Candidacy registered: August 2, 2022
Campaign website: 
Campaign slogan: Leadership that Works for You
Campaign slogan (French): Un leadership à votre service

Graham MacDonald

Graham Macdonald, 39, is a businessman and the founder & former CEO of Ottawa Mortuary Services. He previously served as the President of the Ottawa District Funeral Service Association.
Candidacy registered: May 3, 2022
Campaign website: 
Campaign slogan: Accountability

Mike Maguire

Mike Maguire, 61, is an independent management consultant and a former public servant. He was the mayoral runner-up in the 2014 and a candidate in 2010. He considers himself to on the right wing of the political spectrum.
Candidacy registered: June 29, 2022
Campaign website: 
Campaign slogan: Responsibility, Integrity, Leadership
Campaign slogan (French): Responsabilité, Intégrité, Leadership

Catherine McKenney

Catherine McKenney, 61, is the city councillor for Somerset Ward since 2014. Prior to being elected to city council, McKenney was a political staffer to councillors Alex Munter and Diane Holmes, and MPs Ed Broadbent and Paul Dewar.
Candidacy announced: December 10, 2021
Candidacy registered: May 3, 2022
Campaign website: 
Campaign slogan: Let's build a city that works for all of us
Campaign slogan (French): Bâtissons une ville inclusive!
Policies: More trees and greenspace, putting climate action at the centre of all the City's decisions, reinvesting in social services and supports for Ottawa's most vulnerable, investing in active transportation and recreation, make bussing and the LRT easier and more convenient, make transit as affordable as possible to reduce congestion, restore trust, transparency and accountability at city hall, grow arts, entertainment and culture sector.

Ade Olumide

Ade Olumide, 51, is a taxpayer rights advocate and former President of the Municipal Taxpayer Advocacy Group. He sought the Conservative Party of Canada nomination for Kanata—Carleton for the 2015 Canadian federal election, but was disqualified with no reason provided. Olumide later challenged the decision in court, citing his ethnic origin as the reason for his disqualification.
Candidacy registered: May 10, 2022
Campaign website: 
Campaign slogan: Competence and Ethics
Campaign slogan (French): Compétence et éthique
Policies: Develop a Police Complaints Bill of Rights for victims which include the general public & police officers; maximize the ratio of sworn vs unsworn police through attrition to reduce the impact of $151,000 annual compensation per person; appoint an Ottawa Ombudsman to review complaints about the Integrity Commissioner, Auditor General, Board or City Manager decisions in accordance with an Ottawa Civil & Property Bill of Rights; end home construction policies that disadvantage new home buyers; manage the city through an Income Equity Lens and place a 1% cap on taxes increases; invest approximately $63 million towards free transit for low-income residents, a rural home to shuttle LRT, and increase road maintenance through a 4-year hiring freeze on city employees and hire contractors to fill any gaps that may arise; end landfill methane emissions by building an ethanol zero-waste recycling center for weekly collection of organics, recycling, garbage, construction, electronics; and develop a bylaw regarding windmills.

Param Singh
Paramjit Singh, 46, is a police officer with the Ottawa Police Service. Singh is fluent in three languages: English, French, and Punjabi.
Candidacy registered: May 16, 2022
Campaign website: 
Campaign slogan: A Vision for a Better Future
Campaign slogan (French): Une Vision pour un avenir meilleur

Jacob Solomon

Jacob Solomon, 19, is a student at the University of Ottawa studying political science.
Candidacy registered: August 19, 2022
Campaign website: 
Campaign slogan: I will fix this city

Mark Sutcliffe

Mark Sutcliffe, 54, is an entrepreneur & business consultant, and a former local radio, print, & television media personality.
Candidacy announced: June 29, 2022
Candidacy registered: June 29, 2022
Campaign website: 
Campaign slogan: Leadership for a safe, reliable, and affordable Ottawa.
Campaign slogan (French): Leadership pour une Ottawa sécuritaire, fiable, et abordable.
Policies: Funding police, fire and paramedic services, being tough on the causes of crime, restore confidence in public transit, improve roads, keep taxes, recreation fees and other costs as low as possible.

Declined or dropped out

 Bryan Brulotte, CEO and chair of employment firm MaxSys Staffing and Consulting (1993–present), deputy chief of staff to Paul Dick (1993), Progressive Conservative candidate for Lanark-Carleton in 2000
 Diane Deans, incumbent city councillor for Gloucester-Southgate Ward (1994–present). She had announced she would be running but dropped out. (Endorsed McKenney)
 Mathieu Fleury, incumbent city councillor for Rideau-Vanier (2010–present)
 Lisa MacLeod, incumbent MPP for Nepean; former provincial Minister of Tourism, Culture and Sport (2019–2022), Minister of Children, Community and Social Services and Minister Responsible for Women's Issues (2018–2019) (Endorsed Sutcliffe)
 Catherine McKenna, former MP for Ottawa Centre (2015–2021), former federal Minister of Environment and Climate Change (2015-2019) and Minister of Infrastructure and Communities (2019–2021) (Endorsed McKenney)
 Shawn Menard, incumbent city councilor for Capital Ward, former manager of government relations for the Federation of Canadian Municipalities (Running for re-election; endorsed McKenney)
 Jim Watson, incumbent Mayor; former MPP for Ottawa West—Nepean (2003–2010), former provincial cabinet minister under Dalton McGuinty, former city councillor for Capital Ward (1991–1997)

Issues

Endorsements

Polls
Voting intentions for Mayor of Ottawa

Debates and forums

Mayoral results

Detailed results

City Council

Ward results

Orléans East-Cumberland Ward
Incumbent city councillor Matthew Luloff was elected in 2018 with 23.76% of the vote. He ran again and was re-elected.
Nominated candidates
Rosemee Cantave, research coordinator
Tessa Franklin, former concert promoter
Matthew Luloff, incumbent city councillor

Results

|-
! rowspan="2" colspan="2"|Candidate
! colspan="3"|Popular vote
! rowspan="2" colspan="2"|Expenditures
|-
! Votes
! %
! ±%
|-
| style="background-color:#800020;" |
| style="text-align:left;"  | Matthew Luloff (X)
| style="text-align:right;" | 11,919
| style="text-align:right;" | 74.17
| style="text-align:right;" | +50.41
| style="text-align:right;" |
|-
| style="background-color:#3B3B3B;" |
| style="text-align:left;"  | Rosemee Cantave
| style="text-align:right;" | 2,376
| style="text-align:right;" | 14.79
| style="text-align:right;" |
| style="text-align:right;" |
|-
| style="background-color:#d81159;" |
| style="text-align:left;"  | Tessa Franklin
| style="text-align:right;" | 1,775
| style="text-align:right;" | 11.05
| style="text-align:right;" |
| style="text-align:right;" |
|-

| style="text-align:right;background-color:#FFFFFF;" colspan="2" |Total valid votes
| style="text-align:right;background-color:#FFFFFF;" | 16,070
| style="text-align:right;background-color:#FFFFFF;" | 97.82
| style="text-align:right;background-color:#c2c2c2;" colspan="2" |
|-
| style="text-align:right;background-color:#FFFFFF;" colspan="2" |Total rejected, unmarked and declined votes
| style="text-align:right;background-color:#FFFFFF;" | 358
| style="text-align:right;background-color:#FFFFFF;" | 2.18
| style="text-align:right;background-color:#c2c2c2;" colspan="2" |
|-
| style="text-align:right;background-color:#FFFFFF;" colspan="2" |Turnout
| style="text-align:right;background-color:#FFFFFF;" | 16,428
| style="text-align:right;background-color:#FFFFFF;" | 42.54
| style="text-align:right;background-color:#FFFFFF;" | -0.60
| style="text-align:right;background-color:#c2c2c2;" |
|-
| style="text-align:right;background-color:#FFFFFF;" colspan="2" |Eligible voters
| style="text-align:right;background-color:#FFFFFF;" | 38,618
| style="text-align:right;background-color:#c2c2c2;" colspan="3" |
|-
| style="text-align:left;" colspan="6" |Note: Candidate campaign colours are based on the prominent colour used in campaign items (signs, literature, etc.)and are used as a visual differentiation between candidates.
|-
| style="text-align:left;" colspan="13" |Sources:
|}

Orléans West-Innes Ward
Incumbent city councillor Laura Dudas was elected in 2018 with 41.37% of the vote. She ran again and was re-elected.

Nominated candidates
Laura Dudas, incumbent city councillor
Chris Fraser, candidate for this ward in 2010 and 2014
Lori Stinson, professor at Carleton University and University of Ottawa
Results

|-
! rowspan="2" colspan="2"|Candidate
! colspan="3"|Popular vote
! rowspan="2" colspan="2"|Expenditures
|-
! Votes
! %
! ±%
|-
| style="background-color:#6834cc;" |
| style="text-align:left;"  | Laura Dudas (X)
| style="text-align:right;" | 11,821
| style="text-align:right;" | 71.43
| style="text-align:right;" | +30.06
| style="text-align:right;" |
|-
| style="background-color:#4eb14c;" |
| style="text-align:left;"  | Lori Stinson
| style="text-align:right;" | 3,309
| style="text-align:right;" | 19.99
| style="text-align:right;" |
| style="text-align:right;" |
|-
| style="background-color:#043454;" |
| style="text-align:left;"  | Chris Fraser
| style="text-align:right;" | 1,420
| style="text-align:right;" | 8.58
| style="text-align:right;" |
| style="text-align:right;" |
|-
| style="text-align:right;background-color:#FFFFFF;" colspan="2" |Total valid votes
| style="text-align:right;background-color:#FFFFFF;" | 16,550
| style="text-align:right;background-color:#FFFFFF;" | 97.99
| style="text-align:right;background-color:#c2c2c2;" colspan="2" |
|-
| style="text-align:right;background-color:#FFFFFF;" colspan="2" |Total rejected, unmarked and declined votes
| style="text-align:right;background-color:#FFFFFF;" | 339
| style="text-align:right;background-color:#FFFFFF;" | 2.01
| style="text-align:right;background-color:#c2c2c2;" colspan="2" |
|-
| style="text-align:right;background-color:#FFFFFF;" colspan="2" |Turnout
| style="text-align:right;background-color:#FFFFFF;" | 16,889
| style="text-align:right;background-color:#FFFFFF;" | 45.22
| style="text-align:right;background-color:#FFFFFF;" | +1.45
| style="text-align:right;background-color:#c2c2c2;" |
|-
| style="text-align:right;background-color:#FFFFFF;" colspan="2" |Eligible voters
| style="text-align:right;background-color:#FFFFFF;" | 37347
| style="text-align:right;background-color:#c2c2c2;" colspan="3" |
|-
| style="text-align:left;" colspan="6" |Note: Candidate campaign colours are based on the prominent colour used in campaign items (signs, literature, etc.)and are used as a visual differentiation between candidates.
|-
| style="text-align:left;" colspan="13" |Sources:
|}

Barrhaven West Ward
Incumbent city councillor Jan Harder was re-elected in 2018 with 74.27% of the vote. She did not seek re-election.

Nominated candidates
Jay Chadha, project manager at OC Transpo
Sadaf Ebrahim, host and producer at Canadian Peoples Channel
David Hill, former member of the Canadian Armed Forces
Taayo Simmonds, lawyer
Results

|-
! rowspan="2" colspan="2"|Candidate
! colspan="3"|Popular vote
! rowspan="2" colspan="2"|Expenditures
|-
! Votes
! %
! ±%
|-
| style="background-color:#41BFB3;" |
| style="text-align:left;"  | David Hill
| style="text-align:right;" | 6,230
| style="text-align:right;" | 43.97
| style="text-align:right;" |
| style="text-align:right;" |
|-
| style="background-color:#0E73D1;" |
| style="text-align:left;"  | Taayo Simmonds
| style="text-align:right;" | 4,737
| style="text-align:right;" | 33.43
| style="text-align:right;" |
| style="text-align:right;" |
|-
| style="background-color:#b044fc;" |
| style="text-align:left;"  | Jay Chadha
| style="text-align:right;" | 2,200
| style="text-align:right;" | 15.53
| style="text-align:right;" |
| style="text-align:right;" |
|-
| style="background-color:#08246c;" |
| style="text-align:left;"  | Sadaf Ebrahim
| style="text-align:right;" | 1,001
| style="text-align:right;" | 7.07
| style="text-align:right;" |
| style="text-align:right;" |
|-
| style="text-align:right;background-color:#FFFFFF;" colspan="2" |Total valid votes
| style="text-align:right;background-color:#FFFFFF;" | 14,168
| style="text-align:right;background-color:#FFFFFF;" | 98.35
| style="text-align:right;background-color:#c2c2c2;" colspan="2" |
|-
| style="text-align:right;background-color:#FFFFFF;" colspan="2" |Total rejected, unmarked and declined votes
| style="text-align:right;background-color:#FFFFFF;" | 238
| style="text-align:right;background-color:#FFFFFF;" | 1.65
| style="text-align:right;background-color:#c2c2c2;" colspan="2" |
|-
| style="text-align:right;background-color:#FFFFFF;" colspan="2" |Turnout
| style="text-align:right;background-color:#FFFFFF;" | 14,406
| style="text-align:right;background-color:#FFFFFF;" | 45.81
| style="text-align:right;background-color:#FFFFFF;" | +3.10
| style="text-align:right;background-color:#c2c2c2;" |
|-
| style="text-align:right;background-color:#FFFFFF;" colspan="2" |Eligible voters
| style="text-align:right;background-color:#FFFFFF;" | 31,446
| style="text-align:right;background-color:#c2c2c2;" colspan="3" |
|-
| style="text-align:left;" colspan="6" |Note: Candidate campaign colours are based on the prominent colour used in campaign items (signs, literature, etc.)and are used as a visual differentiation between candidates.
|-
| style="text-align:left;" colspan="13" |Sources:
|}

Kanata North Ward
Incumbent city councillor Cathy Curry was appointed to the seat on November 10, 2021, after her predecessor, Jenna Sudds, was elected as Member of Parliament for Kanata—Carleton on September 20, 2021. She ran again seeking a full-term and was re-elected.

Nominated candidates
Viorel Copil, chief financial management advisor for the Canada Border Services Agency
Cathy Curry, incumbent city councillor
Christine Moulaison, co-chair of the Ottawa-Carleton Assembly of Schools Councils
Results

|-
! rowspan="2" colspan="2"|Candidate
! colspan="3"|Popular vote
! rowspan="2" colspan="2"|Expenditures
|-
! Votes
! %
! ±%
|-
| style="background-color:#1C76E4;" |
| style="text-align:left;"  | Cathy Curry (X)
| style="text-align:right;" | 8,827
| style="text-align:right;" | 76.75
| style="text-align:right;" |
| style="text-align:right;" |
|-
| style="background-color:#c8242c;" |
| style="text-align:left;"  | Viorel Copil
| style="text-align:right;" | 1,583
| style="text-align:right;" | 13.37
| style="text-align:right;" |
| style="text-align:right;" |
|-
| style="background-color:#473b7b;" |
| style="text-align:left;"  | Christine Moulaison
| style="text-align:right;" | 1,136
| style="text-align:right;" | 9.88
| style="text-align:right;" |
| style="text-align:right;" |
|-
| style="text-align:right;background-color:#FFFFFF;" colspan="2" |Total valid votes
| style="text-align:right;background-color:#FFFFFF;" | 11,501
| style="text-align:right;background-color:#FFFFFF;" | 97.44
| style="text-align:right;background-color:#c2c2c2;" colspan="2" |
|-
| style="text-align:right;background-color:#FFFFFF;" colspan="2" |Total rejected, unmarked and declined votes
| style="text-align:right;background-color:#FFFFFF;" | 302
| style="text-align:right;background-color:#FFFFFF;" | 2.56
| style="text-align:right;background-color:#c2c2c2;" colspan="2" |
|-
| style="text-align:right;background-color:#FFFFFF;" colspan="2" |Turnout
| style="text-align:right;background-color:#FFFFFF;" | 11,803
| style="text-align:right;background-color:#FFFFFF;" | 43.54
| style="text-align:right;background-color:#FFFFFF;" | -4.67
| style="text-align:right;background-color:#c2c2c2;" |
|-
| style="text-align:right;background-color:#FFFFFF;" colspan="2" |Eligible voters
| style="text-align:right;background-color:#FFFFFF;" | 27108
| style="text-align:right;background-color:#c2c2c2;" colspan="3" |
|-
| style="text-align:left;" colspan="6" |Note: Candidate campaign colours are based on the prominent colour used in campaign items (signs, literature, etc.)and are used as a visual differentiation between candidates.
|-
| style="text-align:left;" colspan="13" |Sources:
|}

West Carleton-March Ward
Incumbent city councillor Eli El-Chantiry was re-elected in 2018 with 65.90% of the vote. He did not seek re-election.
Nominated candidates
Colin Driscoll
Sasha Duguay, legislative assistant to Conservative MP Glen Motz
Clarke Kelly, legislative assistant to Liberal MP Ryan Turnbull
Ian Madill
Stephanie Maghnam, 2018 provincial Liberal candidate in Kanata—Carleton
Greg Patacairk, president of the Dunrobin community association
Nagmani Sharma, software engineer
Results

|-
! rowspan="2" colspan="2"|Candidate
! colspan="3"|Popular vote
! rowspan="2" colspan="2"|Expenditures
|-
! Votes
! %
! ±%
|-
| style="background-color:#1A4782;" |
| style="text-align:left;"  | Clarke Kelly
| style="text-align:right;" | 2,550
| style="text-align:right;" | 27.40
| style="text-align:right;" |
| style="text-align:right;" |
|-
| style="background-color:#1452E2;" |
| style="text-align:left;"  | Sasha Duguay
| style="text-align:right;" | 2,307
| style="text-align:right;" | 24.79
| style="text-align:right;" |
| style="text-align:right;" |
|-
| style="background-color:#9C9FA1;" |
| style="text-align:left;"  | Greg Patacairk
| style="text-align:right;" | 1,988
| style="text-align:right;" | 21.36
| style="text-align:right;" |
| style="text-align:right;" |
|-
| style="background-color:#59c1bd;" |
| style="text-align:left;"  | Stephanie Maghnam
| style="text-align:right;" | 1,404
| style="text-align:right;" | 15.09
| style="text-align:right;" |
| style="text-align:right;" |
|-
| style="background-color:#1E73BE;" |
| style="text-align:left;"  | Nagmani Sharma
| style="text-align:right;" | 542
| style="text-align:right;" | 5.82
| style="text-align:right;" |
| style="text-align:right;" |
|-
| style="background-color:#205cac;" |
| style="text-align:left;"  | Ian Madill
| style="text-align:right;" | 438
| style="text-align:right;" | 4.71
| style="text-align:right;" |
| style="text-align:right;" |
|-
| style="background-color:#FFFFFF;" |
| style="text-align:left;"  | Colin Driscoll
| style="text-align:right;" | 78
| style="text-align:right;" | 0.84
| style="text-align:right;" |
| style="text-align:right;" |
|-
| style="text-align:right;background-color:#FFFFFF;" colspan="2" |Total valid votes
| style="text-align:right;background-color:#FFFFFF;" | 9307
| style="text-align:right;background-color:#FFFFFF;" | 98.56
| style="text-align:right;background-color:#c2c2c2;" colspan="2" |
|-
| style="text-align:right;background-color:#FFFFFF;" colspan="2" |Total rejected, unmarked and declined votes
| style="text-align:right;background-color:#FFFFFF;" | 136
| style="text-align:right;background-color:#FFFFFF;" | 1.44
| style="text-align:right;background-color:#c2c2c2;" colspan="2" |
|-
| style="text-align:right;background-color:#FFFFFF;" colspan="2" |Turnout
| style="text-align:right;background-color:#FFFFFF;" | 9443
| style="text-align:right;background-color:#FFFFFF;" | 46.95
| style="text-align:right;background-color:#FFFFFF;" | +4.15
| style="text-align:right;background-color:#c2c2c2;" |
|-
| style="text-align:right;background-color:#FFFFFF;" colspan="2" |Eligible voters
| style="text-align:right;background-color:#FFFFFF;" | 20,113
| style="text-align:right;background-color:#c2c2c2;" colspan="3" |
|-
| style="text-align:left;" colspan="6" |Note: Candidate campaign colours are based on the prominent colour used in campaign items (signs, literature, etc.)and are used as a visual differentiation between candidates.
|-
| style="text-align:left;" colspan="13" |Sources:
|}

Stittsville Ward
Incumbent city councillor Glen Gower was elected in 2018 with 57.86% of the vote. He ran again and was re-elected with a slight gain in vote share.

Nominated candidates
Mathew Duchesne, realtor
Glen Gower, incumbent city councillor
Tanya Hein, former president of the Stittsville Village Association
Kevin Hua, federal NDP candidate in Carleton in 2019 and 2021
Results

|-
! rowspan="2" colspan="2"|Candidate
! colspan="3"|Popular vote
! rowspan="2" colspan="2"|Expenditures
|-
! Votes
! %
! ±%
|-
| style="background-color:#01546C;" |
| style="text-align:left;"  | Glen Gower (X)
| style="text-align:right;" | 7,758
| style="text-align:right;" | 58.67
| style="text-align:right;" | +0.81
| style="text-align:right;" |
|-
| style="background-color:#001d4b;" |
| style="text-align:left;"  | Mathew Duchesne
| style="text-align:right;" | 2,692
| style="text-align:right;" | 20.36
| style="text-align:right;" |
| style="text-align:right;" |
|-
| style="background-color:#FEF1F0;" |
| style="text-align:left;"  | Tanya Hein
| style="text-align:right;" | 1,528
| style="text-align:right;" | 11.56
| style="text-align:right;" |
| style="text-align:right;" |
|-
| style="background-color:#01B7B9;" |
| style="text-align:left;"  | Kevin Hua
| style="text-align:right;" | 1,244
| style="text-align:right;" | 9.41
| style="text-align:right;" |
| style="text-align:right;" |
|-
| style="text-align:right;background-color:#FFFFFF;" colspan="2" |Total valid votes
| style="text-align:right;background-color:#FFFFFF;" | 13,222
| style="text-align:right;background-color:#FFFFFF;" | 98.99
| style="text-align:right;background-color:#c2c2c2;" colspan="2" |
|-
| style="text-align:right;background-color:#FFFFFF;" colspan="2" |Total rejected, unmarked and declined votes
| style="text-align:right;background-color:#FFFFFF;" | 135
| style="text-align:right;background-color:#FFFFFF;" | 1.01
| style="text-align:right;background-color:#c2c2c2;" colspan="2" |
|-
| style="text-align:right;background-color:#FFFFFF;" colspan="2" |Turnout
| style="text-align:right;background-color:#FFFFFF;" | 13,357
| style="text-align:right;background-color:#FFFFFF;" | 45.59
| style="text-align:right;background-color:#FFFFFF;" | -0.78
| style="text-align:right;background-color:#c2c2c2;" |
|-
| style="text-align:right;background-color:#FFFFFF;" colspan="2" |Eligible voters
| style="text-align:right;background-color:#FFFFFF;" | 29,298
| style="text-align:right;background-color:#c2c2c2;" colspan="3" |
|-
| style="text-align:left;" colspan="6" |Note: Candidate campaign colours are based on the prominent colour used in campaign items (signs, literature, etc.)and are used as a visual differentiation between candidates.
|-
| style="text-align:left;" colspan="13" |Sources:
|}

Bay Ward
Incumbent city councillor Theresa Kavanagh was elected in 2018 with 55.17% of the vote. She ran again and was re-elected.

Nominated candidates
Othman Alhusain
Robert Hill, former student advisor to the Minister of Education
Theresa Kavanagh, incumbent city councillor
Results

|-
! rowspan="2" colspan="2"|Candidate
! colspan="3"|Popular vote
! rowspan="2" colspan="2"|Expenditures
|-
! Votes
! %
! ±%
|-
| style="background-color:#AC65CA;" |
| style="text-align:left;"  | Theresa Kavanagh (X)
| style="text-align:right;" | 12,398
| style="text-align:right;" | 82.79
| style="text-align:right;" | +27.62
| style="text-align:right;" |
|-
| style="background-color:#00994a;" |
| style="text-align:left;"  | Robert Hill
| style="text-align:right;" | 1,659
| style="text-align:right;" | 11.08
| style="text-align:right;" |
| style="text-align:right;" |
|-
| style="background-color:#007bbf;" |
| style="text-align:left;"  | Othman Alhusain
| style="text-align:right;" | 919
| style="text-align:right;" | 6.14
| style="text-align:right;" |
| style="text-align:right;" |
|-
| style="text-align:right;background-color:#FFFFFF;" colspan="2" |Total valid votes
| style="text-align:right;background-color:#FFFFFF;" | 14,976
| style="text-align:right;background-color:#FFFFFF;" | 96.45
| style="text-align:right;background-color:#c2c2c2;" colspan="2" |
|-
| style="text-align:right;background-color:#FFFFFF;" colspan="2" |Total rejected, unmarked and declined votes
| style="text-align:right;background-color:#FFFFFF;" | 551
| style="text-align:right;background-color:#FFFFFF;" | 3.55
| style="text-align:right;background-color:#c2c2c2;" colspan="2" |
|-
| style="text-align:right;background-color:#FFFFFF;" colspan="2" |Turnout
| style="text-align:right;background-color:#FFFFFF;" | 15,527
| style="text-align:right;background-color:#FFFFFF;" | 43.77
| style="text-align:right;background-color:#FFFFFF;" | +2.14
| style="text-align:right;background-color:#c2c2c2;" |
|-
| style="text-align:right;background-color:#FFFFFF;" colspan="2" |Eligible voters
| style="text-align:right;background-color:#FFFFFF;" | 35473
| style="text-align:right;background-color:#c2c2c2;" colspan="3" |
|-
| style="text-align:left;" colspan="6" |Note: Candidate campaign colours are based on the prominent colour used in campaign items (signs, literature, etc.)and are used as a visual differentiation between candidates.
|-
| style="text-align:left;" colspan="13" |Sources:
|}

College Ward
Incumbent city councillor Rick Chiarelli was re-elected in 2018 with 46.79% of the vote. He had indicated he "expected" to run for re-election, but ultimately chose not to file.

Nominated candidates
Wendy Davidson
Laine Johnson, director of tenant and community engagement at Centretown Citizens Ottawa Corporation.
Granda Kopytko, National Executive Director of the Canadian Association of Professional Employees
Pat McGarry
Vilteau Delvas, Ontario Party candidate for Ottawa West—Nepean in 2022
Results

|-
! rowspan="2" colspan="2"|Candidate
! colspan="3"|Popular vote
! rowspan="2" colspan="2"|Expenditures
|-
! Votes
! %
! ±%
|-
| style="background-color:#ECB421;" |
| style="text-align:left;"  | Laine Johnson
| style="text-align:right;" | 8,899
| style="text-align:right;" | 52.64
| style="text-align:right;" |
| style="text-align:right;" |
|-
| style="background-color:#1A1D3E;" |
| style="text-align:left;"  | Pat McGarry
| style="text-align:right;" | 5,652
| style="text-align:right;" | 33.43
| style="text-align:right;" |
| style="text-align:right;" |
|-
| style="background-color:#5DD9ED;" |
| style="text-align:left;"  | Wendy Davidson
| style="text-align:right;" | 1,338
| style="text-align:right;" | 7.91
| style="text-align:right;" |
| style="text-align:right;" |
|-
| style="background-color:#243559;" |
| style="text-align:left;"  | Granda Kopytko
| style="text-align:right;" | 649
| style="text-align:right;" | 3.84
| style="text-align:right;" |
| style="text-align:right;" |
|-
| style="background-color:#132F53;" |
| style="text-align:left;"  | Vilteau Delvas
| style="text-align:right;" | 368
| style="text-align:right;" | 2.18
| style="text-align:right;" |
| style="text-align:right;" |
|-
| style="text-align:right;background-color:#FFFFFF;" colspan="2" |Total valid votes
| style="text-align:right;background-color:#FFFFFF;" | 16,906
| style="text-align:right;background-color:#FFFFFF;" | 97.54
| style="text-align:right;background-color:#c2c2c2;" colspan="2" |
|-
| style="text-align:right;background-color:#FFFFFF;" colspan="2" |Total rejected, unmarked and declined votes
| style="text-align:right;background-color:#FFFFFF;" | 427
| style="text-align:right;background-color:#FFFFFF;" | 2.46
| style="text-align:right;background-color:#c2c2c2;" colspan="2" |
|-
| style="text-align:right;background-color:#FFFFFF;" colspan="2" |Turnout
| style="text-align:right;background-color:#FFFFFF;" | 17,333
| style="text-align:right;background-color:#FFFFFF;" | 46.90
| style="text-align:right;background-color:#FFFFFF;" | +2.10
| style="text-align:right;background-color:#c2c2c2;" |
|-
| style="text-align:right;background-color:#FFFFFF;" colspan="2" |Eligible voters
| style="text-align:right;background-color:#FFFFFF;" | 36,958
| style="text-align:right;background-color:#c2c2c2;" colspan="3" |
|-
| style="text-align:left;" colspan="6" |Note: Candidate campaign colours are based on the prominent colour used in campaign items (signs, literature, etc.)and are used as a visual differentiation between candidates.
|-
| style="text-align:left;" colspan="13" |Sources:
|}

Knoxdale-Merivale Ward
Incumbent city councillor Keith Egli was re-elected in 2018 with 63.12% of the vote. He did not seek re-election.

Nominated candidates
Joseph Ben-Ami, conservative writer, strategist and organizer
James Dean, real-estate agent, board member of Quality Living House Cooperative and candidate for this ward in 2006, 2010, 2018
Sean Devine, funding officer at Canada Council, former president of the Trend Arlington Community Association, and federal NDP candidate in Nepean in 2015 and 2021
Myles Egli, brother of incumbent councillor Keith Egli and president of the Manordale-Woodvale Community Association
Peter Anthony Weber, heavy equipment operator and candidate for this ward in 2018
Peter Westaway, bike mechanic
Michael Wood, professor at Algonquin College
Results

|-
! rowspan="2" colspan="2"|Candidate
! colspan="3"|Popular vote
! rowspan="2" colspan="2"|Expenditures
|-
! Votes
! %
! ±%
|-
| style="background-color:#E01F5B;" |
| style="text-align:left;"  | Sean Devine
| style="text-align:right;" | 4,812
| style="text-align:right;" | 39.20
| style="text-align:right;" | –
| style="text-align:right;" |
|-
| style="background-color:#5EA454;" |
| style="text-align:left;"  | James Dean
| style="text-align:right;" | 2,564
| style="text-align:right;" | 20.89
| style="text-align:right;" | +1.05
| style="text-align:right;" |
|-
| style="background-color:#FFF101;" |
| style="text-align:left;"  | Myles Egli
| style="text-align:right;" | 2,051
| style="text-align:right;" | 16.71
| style="text-align:right;" | –
| style="text-align:right;" |
|-
| style="background-color:#202693;" |
| style="text-align:left;"  | Joseph Ben-Ami
| style="text-align:right;" | 1,426
| style="text-align:right;" | 11.62
| style="text-align:right;" | –
| style="text-align:right;" |
|-
| style="background-color:#442565;" |
| style="text-align:left;"  | Michael Wood
| style="text-align:right;" | 1,228
| style="text-align:right;" | 10.00
| style="text-align:right;" | –
| style="text-align:right;" |
|-
| style="background-color:#abdfb9;" |
| style="text-align:left;"  | Peter Westaway
| style="text-align:right;" | 118
| style="text-align:right;" | 0.96
| style="text-align:right;" | –
| style="text-align:right;" |
|-
| style="background-color:#FFFFFF;" |
| style="text-align:left;"  | Peter Anthony Weber
| style="text-align:right;" | 77
| style="text-align:right;" | 0.63
| style="text-align:right;" | -1.99
| style="text-align:right;" |
|-
| style="text-align:right;background-color:#FFFFFF;" colspan="2" |Total valid votes
| style="text-align:right;background-color:#FFFFFF;" | 12,276
| style="text-align:right;background-color:#FFFFFF;" | 97.47
| style="text-align:right;background-color:#c2c2c2;" colspan="2" |
|-
| style="text-align:right;background-color:#FFFFFF;" colspan="2" |Total rejected, unmarked and declined votes
| style="text-align:right;background-color:#FFFFFF;" | 318
| style="text-align:right;background-color:#FFFFFF;" | 2.53
| style="text-align:right;background-color:#c2c2c2;" colspan="2" |
|-
| style="text-align:right;background-color:#FFFFFF;" colspan="2" |Turnout
| style="text-align:right;background-color:#FFFFFF;" | 12,594
| style="text-align:right;background-color:#FFFFFF;" | 45.55
| style="text-align:right;background-color:#FFFFFF;" | +5.52
| style="text-align:right;background-color:#c2c2c2;" |
|-
| style="text-align:right;background-color:#FFFFFF;" colspan="2" |Eligible voters
| style="text-align:right;background-color:#FFFFFF;" | 27,650
| style="text-align:right;background-color:#c2c2c2;" colspan="3" |
|-
| style="text-align:left;" colspan="6" |Note: Candidate campaign colours are based on the prominent colour used in campaign items (signs, literature, etc.)and are used as a visual differentiation between candidates.
|-
| style="text-align:left;" colspan="13" |Sources:
|}

Gloucester-Southgate Ward
Incumbent city councillor Diane Deans was re-elected in 2018 with 56.08% of the vote. She had announced that she would not be seeking re-election in order to run for mayor, but later declared she would not run for either.

Nominated candidates
Aria Alavi, journalist and owner of Edict Legal Services
Jessica Bradley, executive assistant to Diane Deans
Taylor Houstoun, project manager
Ron Keays
Hussein Mahmoud, business planning consultant, candidate for Alta Vista Ward in 2014
John Redins, disability rights advocate and perennial candidate

Results

|-
! rowspan="2" colspan="2"|Candidate
! colspan="3"|Popular vote
! rowspan="2" colspan="2"|Expenditures
|-
! Votes
! %
! ±%
|-
| style="background-color:#492970;" |
| style="text-align:left;"  | Jessica Bradley
| style="text-align:right;" | 4,927
| style="text-align:right;" | 42.24
| style="text-align:right;" |
| style="text-align:right;" |
|-
| style="background-color:#000000;" |
| style="text-align:left;"  | Hussein Mahmoud
| style="text-align:right;" | 2,809
| style="text-align:right;" | 24.08
| style="text-align:right;" |
| style="text-align:right;" |
|-
| style="background-color:#e80454;" |
| style="text-align:left;"  | Taylor Houstoun
| style="text-align:right;" | 2,557
| style="text-align:right;" | 21.92
| style="text-align:right;" |
| style="text-align:right;" |
|-
| style="background-color:#a11e21;" |
| style="text-align:left;"  | Aria Alavi
| style="text-align:right;" | 716
| style="text-align:right;" | 6.14
| style="text-align:right;" |
| style="text-align:right;" |
|-
| style="background-color:#B9B9B9;" |
| style="text-align:left;"  | John Redins
| style="text-align:right;" | 333
| style="text-align:right;" | 2.85
| style="text-align:right;" |
| style="text-align:right;" |
|-
| style="background-color:#66615c;" |
| style="text-align:left;"  | Ron Keays
| style="text-align:right;" | 323
| style="text-align:right;" | 2.77
| style="text-align:right;" |
| style="text-align:right;" |
|-
| style="text-align:right;background-color:#FFFFFF;" colspan="2" |Total valid votes
| style="text-align:right;background-color:#FFFFFF;" | 11,665
| style="text-align:right;background-color:#FFFFFF;" | 96.72
| style="text-align:right;background-color:#c2c2c2;" colspan="2" |
|-
| style="text-align:right;background-color:#FFFFFF;" colspan="2" |Total rejected, unmarked and declined votes
| style="text-align:right;background-color:#FFFFFF;" | 396
| style="text-align:right;background-color:#FFFFFF;" | 3.28
| style="text-align:right;background-color:#c2c2c2;" colspan="2" |
|-
| style="text-align:right;background-color:#FFFFFF;" colspan="2" |Turnout
| style="text-align:right;background-color:#FFFFFF;" | 12,061
| style="text-align:right;background-color:#FFFFFF;" | 37.53
| style="text-align:right;background-color:#FFFFFF;" | -0.67
| style="text-align:right;background-color:#c2c2c2;" |
|-
| style="text-align:right;background-color:#FFFFFF;" colspan="2" |Eligible voters
| style="text-align:right;background-color:#FFFFFF;" | 32,139
| style="text-align:right;background-color:#c2c2c2;" colspan="3" |
|-
| style="text-align:left;" colspan="6" |Note: Candidate campaign colours are based on the prominent colour used in campaign items (signs, literature, etc.)and are used as a visual differentiation between candidates.
|-
| style="text-align:left;" colspan="13" |Sources:
|}

Beacon Hill-Cyrville Ward
Incumbent city councillor Tim Tierney was re-elected in 2018 with 81.34% of the vote. He ran again and was re-elected.

Nominated candidates
Nicolas Castro
Miranda Gray, project manager, candidate for Orléans Ward in 2018
Tim Tierney, incumbent city councillor

Results

|-
! rowspan="2" colspan="2"|Candidate
! colspan="3"|Popular vote
! rowspan="2" colspan="2"|Expenditures
|-
! Votes
! %
! ±%
|-
| style="background-color:#fe0000;" |
| style="text-align:left;"  | Tim Tierney (X)
| style="text-align:right;" | 7,617
| style="text-align:right;" | 81.96
| style="text-align:right;" | +0.62
| style="text-align:right;" |
|-
| style="background-color:#FFFFFF;" |
| style="text-align:left;"  | Miranda Gray
| style="text-align:right;" | 1,265
| style="text-align:right;" | 13.61
| style="text-align:right;" |
| style="text-align:right;" |
|-
| style="background-color:#FFFFFF;" |
| style="text-align:left;"  | Nicolas Castro
| style="text-align:right;" | 411
| style="text-align:right;" | 4.42
| style="text-align:right;" |
| style="text-align:right;" |
|-
| style="text-align:right;background-color:#FFFFFF;" colspan="2" |Total valid votes
| style="text-align:right;background-color:#FFFFFF;" | 9,293
| style="text-align:right;background-color:#FFFFFF;" | 97.14
| style="text-align:right;background-color:#c2c2c2;" colspan="2" |
|-
| style="text-align:right;background-color:#FFFFFF;" colspan="2" |Total rejected, unmarked and declined votes
| style="text-align:right;background-color:#FFFFFF;" | 274
| style="text-align:right;background-color:#FFFFFF;" | 2.86
| style="text-align:right;background-color:#c2c2c2;" colspan="2" |
|-
| style="text-align:right;background-color:#FFFFFF;" colspan="2" |Turnout
| style="text-align:right;background-color:#FFFFFF;" | 9,567
| style="text-align:right;background-color:#FFFFFF;" | 40.79
| style="text-align:right;background-color:#FFFFFF;" | +2.73
| style="text-align:right;background-color:#c2c2c2;" |
|-
| style="text-align:right;background-color:#FFFFFF;" colspan="2" |Eligible voters
| style="text-align:right;background-color:#FFFFFF;" | 23,452
| style="text-align:right;background-color:#c2c2c2;" colspan="3" |
|-
| style="text-align:left;" colspan="6" |Note: Candidate campaign colours are based on the prominent colour used in campaign items (signs, literature, etc.)and are used as a visual differentiation between candidates.
|-
| style="text-align:left;" colspan="13" |Sources:
|}

Rideau-Vanier Ward
Incumbent city councillor Mathieu Fleury was re-elected in 2018 with 68.08% of the vote. He did not seek re-election.

Nominated candidates
Patrick Auguste
Hicham Boutelab
Tyler Cybulski
Burthomley Douzable, owner of The Family Restaurant
Julie Fiala, artist and provincial Independent candidate for Ottawa—Vanier in the 2020 by-election
Jwane Izzetpanah
Kim Leclerc
Alex Osorio, pastor at Fire of God Ministries
Stéphanie Plante
Laura Shantz, University of Ottawa professor

Results

|-
! rowspan="2" colspan="2"|Candidate
! colspan="3"|Popular vote
! rowspan="2" colspan="2"|Expenditures
|-
! Votes
! %
! ±%
|-
| style="background-color:#FFDE59;" |
| style="text-align:left;"  | Stéphanie Plante
| style="text-align:right;" | 4,621
| style="text-align:right;" | 37.15
| style="text-align:right;" |
| style="text-align:right;" |
|-
| style="background-color:#ED3B36;" |
| style="text-align:left;"  | Laura Shantz
| style="text-align:right;" | 4,298
| style="text-align:right;" | 34.55
| style="text-align:right;" |
| style="text-align:right;" |
|-
| style="background-color:#FF00FF;" |
| style="text-align:left;"  | Julie Fiala
| style="text-align:right;" | 704
| style="text-align:right;" | 5.66
| style="text-align:right;" |
| style="text-align:right;" |
|-
| style="background-color:#F4811F;" |
| style="text-align:left;"  | Alex Osorio
| style="text-align:right;" | 671
| style="text-align:right;" | 5.39
| style="text-align:right;" |
| style="text-align:right;" |
|-
| style="background-color:#183560;" |
| style="text-align:left;"  | Jwane Izzetpanah
| style="text-align:right;" | 564
| style="text-align:right;" | 4.53
| style="text-align:right;" |
| style="text-align:right;" |
|-
| style="background-color:#13407B;" |
| style="text-align:left;"  | Tyler Cybulski
| style="text-align:right;" | 514
| style="text-align:right;" | 4.13
| style="text-align:right;" |
| style="text-align:right;" |
|-
| style="background-color:#bc2c4b;" |
| style="text-align:left;"  | Patrick Auguste
| style="text-align:right;" | 330
| style="text-align:right;" | 2.65
| style="text-align:right;" |
| style="text-align:right;" |
|-
| style="background-color:#410f58;" |
| style="text-align:left;"  | Kim Leclerc
| style="text-align:right;" | 296
| style="text-align:right;" | 2.38
| style="text-align:right;" |
| style="text-align:right;" |
|-
| style="background-color:#0e5828;" |
| style="text-align:left;"  | Burthomley Douzable
| style="text-align:right;" | 266
| style="text-align:right;" | 2.14
| style="text-align:right;" |
| style="text-align:right;" |
|-
| style="background-color:#4ACAA8;" |
| style="text-align:left;"  | Hicham Boutaleb
| style="text-align:right;" | 176
| style="text-align:right;" | 1.41
| style="text-align:right;" |
| style="text-align:right;" |
|-
| style="text-align:right;background-color:#FFFFFF;" colspan="2" |Total valid votes
| style="text-align:right;background-color:#FFFFFF;" | 12,440
| style="text-align:right;background-color:#FFFFFF;" | 96.78
| style="text-align:right;background-color:#c2c2c2;" colspan="2" |
|-
| style="text-align:right;background-color:#FFFFFF;" colspan="2" |Total rejected, unmarked and declined votes
| style="text-align:right;background-color:#FFFFFF;" | 414
| style="text-align:right;background-color:#FFFFFF;" | 3.22
| style="text-align:right;background-color:#c2c2c2;" colspan="2" |
|-
| style="text-align:right;background-color:#FFFFFF;" colspan="2" |Turnout
| style="text-align:right;background-color:#FFFFFF;" | 12,854
| style="text-align:right;background-color:#FFFFFF;" | 37.18
| style="text-align:right;background-color:#FFFFFF;" | -0.36
| style="text-align:right;background-color:#c2c2c2;" |
|-
| style="text-align:right;background-color:#FFFFFF;" colspan="2" |Eligible voters
| style="text-align:right;background-color:#FFFFFF;" | 34,574
| style="text-align:right;background-color:#c2c2c2;" colspan="3" |
|-
| style="text-align:left;" colspan="6" |Note: Candidate campaign colours are based on the prominent colour used in campaign items (signs, literature, etc.)and are used as a visual differentiation between candidates.
|-
| style="text-align:left;" colspan="13" |Sources:
|}

Rideau-Rockcliffe Ward
Incumbent city councillor Rawlson King was elected to the seat in a by-election on April 15, 2019, after his predecessor, Tobi Nussbaum, resigned to accept an appointment to become the CEO of the National Capital Commission on January 26, 2019. He ran again and was re-elected.

Nominated candidates
Clayton Fitzsimmons, realtor
Peter Jan Karwacki, candidate for this ward in the 2019 by-election
Rawlson King, incumbent city councillor
Peter Zanette

Results

|-
! rowspan="2" colspan="2"|Candidate
! colspan="3"|Popular vote
! rowspan="2" colspan="2"|Expenditures
|-
! Votes
! %
! ±%
|-
| style="background-color:#F9E300;" |
| style="text-align:left;"  | Rawlson King (X)
| style="text-align:right;" | 8,481
| style="text-align:right;" | 80.14
| style="text-align:right;" | +61.78
| style="text-align:right;" |
|-
| style="background-color:#0d2123;" |
| style="text-align:left;"  | Clayton Fitzsimmons
| style="text-align:right;" | 859
| style="text-align:right;" | 8.12
| style="text-align:right;" |
| style="text-align:right;" |
|-
| style="background-color:#cc6611;" |
| style="text-align:left;"  | Peter Jan Karwacki
| style="text-align:right;" | 716
| style="text-align:right;" | 6.77
| style="text-align:right;" | +6.19
| style="text-align:right;" |
|-
| style="background-color:#212121;" |
| style="text-align:left;"  | Peter Zanette
| style="text-align:right;" | 527
| style="text-align:right;" | 4.98
| style="text-align:right;" |
| style="text-align:right;" |
|-
| style="text-align:right;background-color:#FFFFFF;" colspan="2" |Total valid votes
| style="text-align:right;background-color:#FFFFFF;" | 10,583
| style="text-align:right;background-color:#FFFFFF;" | 94.36
| style="text-align:right;background-color:#c2c2c2;" colspan="2" |
|-
| style="text-align:right;background-color:#FFFFFF;" colspan="2" |Total rejected, unmarked and declined votes
| style="text-align:right;background-color:#FFFFFF;" | 633
| style="text-align:right;background-color:#FFFFFF;" | 5.64
| style="text-align:right;background-color:#c2c2c2;" colspan="2" |
|-
| style="text-align:right;background-color:#FFFFFF;" colspan="2" |Turnout
| style="text-align:right;background-color:#FFFFFF;" | 11,216
| style="text-align:right;background-color:#FFFFFF;" | 39.74
| style="text-align:right;background-color:#FFFFFF;" | +2.59
| style="text-align:right;background-color:#c2c2c2;" |
|-
| style="text-align:right;background-color:#FFFFFF;" colspan="2" |Eligible voters
| style="text-align:right;background-color:#FFFFFF;" | 28,220
| style="text-align:right;background-color:#c2c2c2;" colspan="3" |
|-
| style="text-align:left;" colspan="6" |Note: Candidate campaign colours are based on the prominent colour used in campaign items (signs, literature, etc.)and are used as a visual differentiation between candidates.
|-
| style="text-align:left;" colspan="13" |Sources:
|}

Somerset Ward
Incumbent city councillor Catherine McKenney was re-elected in 2018 with 76.66% of the vote. They did not seek re-election in order to run for Mayor.
Nominated candidates
Stuart MacKay, co-founder of Ottawa Transit Riders and former board member of the Centretown Community Association (CCA)
Brandon Russell, political operative and provincial Independent candidate for Kamloops-North Thompson, BC in 2020
Ariel Troster, communications professional

Results

|-
! rowspan="2" colspan="2"|Candidate
! colspan="3"|Popular vote
! rowspan="2" colspan="2"|Expenditures
|-
! Votes
! %
! ±%
|-
| style="background-color:#ED396D;" |
| style="text-align:left;"  | Ariel Troster
| style="text-align:right;" | 8,669
| style="text-align:right;" | 61.28
| style="text-align:right;" |
| style="text-align:right;" |
|-
| style="background-color:#187B3E;" |
| style="text-align:left;"  | Stuart MacKay
| style="text-align:right;" | 4,706
| style="text-align:right;" | 33.29
| style="text-align:right;" |
| style="text-align:right;" |
|-
| style="background-color:#A10B0A;" |
| style="text-align:left;"  | Brandon Russell
| style="text-align:right;" | 768
| style="text-align:right;" | 5.43
| style="text-align:right;" |
| style="text-align:right;" |
|-
| style="text-align:right;background-color:#FFFFFF;" colspan="2" |Total valid votes
| style="text-align:right;background-color:#FFFFFF;" | 14,137
| style="text-align:right;background-color:#FFFFFF;" | 95.31
| style="text-align:right;background-color:#c2c2c2;" colspan="2" |
|-
| style="text-align:right;background-color:#FFFFFF;" colspan="2" |Total rejected, unmarked and declined votes
| style="text-align:right;background-color:#FFFFFF;" | 695
| style="text-align:right;background-color:#FFFFFF;" | 4.69
| style="text-align:right;background-color:#c2c2c2;" colspan="2" |
|-
| style="text-align:right;background-color:#FFFFFF;" colspan="2" |Turnout
| style="text-align:right;background-color:#FFFFFF;" | 14,832
| style="text-align:right;background-color:#FFFFFF;" | 45.24
| style="text-align:right;background-color:#FFFFFF;" | +6.14
| style="text-align:right;background-color:#c2c2c2;" |
|-
| style="text-align:right;background-color:#FFFFFF;" colspan="2" |Eligible voters
| style="text-align:right;background-color:#FFFFFF;" | 32,787
| style="text-align:right;background-color:#c2c2c2;" colspan="3" |
|-
| style="text-align:left;" colspan="6" |Note: Candidate campaign colours are based on the prominent colour used in campaign items (signs, literature, etc.)and are used as a visual differentiation between candidates.
|-
| style="text-align:left;" colspan="13" |Sources:
|}

Kitchissippi Ward
Incumbent city councillor Jeff Leiper was re-elected in 2018 with 85.28% of the vote. He ran again and was re-elected.

Nominated candidates
Oonagh Elizabeth Fitzgerald, senior general counsel at the Department of National Defence
Jeff Leiper, incumbent city councillor
Daniel Stringer, former aide to Liberal MPP Richard Patten and candidate for this ward in 2003, 2006, 2010, 2018

Results

|-
! rowspan="2" colspan="2"|Candidate
! colspan="3"|Popular vote
! rowspan="2" colspan="2"|Expenditures
|-
! Votes
! %
! ±%
|-
| style="background-color:#009999;" |
| style="text-align:left;"  | Jeff Leiper (X)
| style="text-align:right;" | 11,055
| style="text-align:right;" | 71.97
| style="text-align:right;" | -13.31
| style="text-align:right;" |
|-
| style="background-color:#D16806;" |
| style="text-align:left;"  | Oonagh Fitzgerald
| style="text-align:right;" | 3,247
| style="text-align:right;" | 21.14
| style="text-align:right;" |
| style="text-align:right;" |
|-
| style="background-color:#40924e;" |
| style="text-align:left;"  | Dan Stringer
| style="text-align:right;" | 1,058
| style="text-align:right;" | 6.89
| style="text-align:right;" | -7.83
| style="text-align:right;" |
|-
| style="text-align:right;background-color:#FFFFFF;" colspan="2" |Total valid votes
| style="text-align:right;background-color:#FFFFFF;" | 15,360
| style="text-align:right;background-color:#FFFFFF;" | 97.78
| style="text-align:right;background-color:#c2c2c2;" colspan="2" |
|-
| style="text-align:right;background-color:#FFFFFF;" colspan="2" |Total rejected, unmarked and declined votes
| style="text-align:right;background-color:#FFFFFF;" | 348
| style="text-align:right;background-color:#FFFFFF;" | 2.22
| style="text-align:right;background-color:#c2c2c2;" colspan="2" |
|-
| style="text-align:right;background-color:#FFFFFF;" colspan="2" |Turnout
| style="text-align:right;background-color:#FFFFFF;" | 15,708
| style="text-align:right;background-color:#FFFFFF;" | 53.03
| style="text-align:right;background-color:#FFFFFF;" | +4.15
| style="text-align:right;background-color:#c2c2c2;" |
|-
| style="text-align:right;background-color:#FFFFFF;" colspan="2" |Eligible voters
| style="text-align:right;background-color:#FFFFFF;" | 29,621
| style="text-align:right;background-color:#c2c2c2;" colspan="3" |
|-
| style="text-align:left;" colspan="6" |Note: Candidate campaign colours are based on the prominent colour used in campaign items (signs, literature, etc.)and are used as a visual differentiation between candidates.
|-
| style="text-align:left;" colspan="13" |Sources:
|}

River Ward
Incumbent city councillor Riley Brockington was re-elected in 2018 with 54.50% of the vote. He ran again and was re-elected.

Nominated candidates
Riley Brockington, incumbent city councillor
Alex Dugal
Ethan Sabourin, legislative assistant to NDP MP Leah Gazan

Results

|-
! rowspan="2" colspan="2"|Candidate
! colspan="3"|Popular vote
! rowspan="2" colspan="2"|Expenditures
|-
! Votes
! %
! ±%
|-
| style="background-color:#830506;" |
| style="text-align:left;"  | Riley Brockington (X)
| style="text-align:right;" | 9,595
| style="text-align:right;" | 73.08
| style="text-align:right;" | +18.58
| style="text-align:right;" |
|-
| style="background-color:#0a333a;" |
| style="text-align:left;"  | Ethan Sabourin
| style="text-align:right;" | 2,396
| style="text-align:right;" | 18.25
| style="text-align:right;" |
| style="text-align:right;" |
|-
| style="background-color:#5d62f9;" |
| style="text-align:left;"  | Alex Dugal
| style="text-align:right;" | 1,139
| style="text-align:right;" | 8.67
| style="text-align:right;" |
| style="text-align:right;" |
|-
| style="text-align:right;background-color:#FFFFFF;" colspan="2" |Total valid votes
| style="text-align:right;background-color:#FFFFFF;" | 13,130
| style="text-align:right;background-color:#FFFFFF;" | 96.83
| style="text-align:right;background-color:#c2c2c2;" colspan="2" |
|-
| style="text-align:right;background-color:#FFFFFF;" colspan="2" |Total rejected, unmarked and declined votes
| style="text-align:right;background-color:#FFFFFF;" | 430
| style="text-align:right;background-color:#FFFFFF;" | 3.17
| style="text-align:right;background-color:#c2c2c2;" colspan="2" |
|-
| style="text-align:right;background-color:#FFFFFF;" colspan="2" |Turnout
| style="text-align:right;background-color:#FFFFFF;" | 13,560
| style="text-align:right;background-color:#FFFFFF;" | 41.06
| style="text-align:right;background-color:#FFFFFF;" | +2.51
| style="text-align:right;background-color:#c2c2c2;" |
|-
| style="text-align:right;background-color:#FFFFFF;" colspan="2" |Eligible voters
| style="text-align:right;background-color:#FFFFFF;" | 33,024
| style="text-align:right;background-color:#c2c2c2;" colspan="3" |
|-
| style="text-align:left;" colspan="6" |Note: Candidate campaign colours are based on the prominent colour used in campaign items (signs, literature, etc.)and are used as a visual differentiation between candidates.
|-
| style="text-align:left;" colspan="13" |Sources:
|}

Capital Ward
Incumbent city councillor Shawn Menard was elected in 2018 with 28.12% of the vote. He ran again and was re-elected.

Nominated candidates
Rebecca Jaremko Bromwich, lawyer and adjunct professor of law at Carleton University
Shawn Menard, incumbent city councillor
Daniel Rogers

Results

|-
! rowspan="2" colspan="2"|Candidate
! colspan="3"|Popular vote
! rowspan="2" colspan="2"|Expenditures
|-
! Votes
! %
! ±%
|-
| style="background-color:#FEDC34;" |
| style="text-align:left;"  | Shawn Menard (X)
| style="text-align:right;" | 11,358
| style="text-align:right;" | 78.81
| style="text-align:right;" | +50.69
| style="text-align:right;" |
|-
| style="background-color:#9a3573;" |
| style="text-align:left;"  | Rebecca Bromwich
| style="text-align:right;" | 1,986
| style="text-align:right;" | 13.78
| style="text-align:right;" |
| style="text-align:right;" |
|-
| style="background-color:#03054d;" |
| style="text-align:left;"  | Daniel Rogers
| style="text-align:right;" | 1,068
| style="text-align:right;" | 7.41
| style="text-align:right;" |
| style="text-align:right;" |
|-
| style="text-align:right;background-color:#FFFFFF;" colspan="2" |Total valid votes
| style="text-align:right;background-color:#FFFFFF;" | 14,412
| style="text-align:right;background-color:#FFFFFF;" | 97.48
| style="text-align:right;background-color:#c2c2c2;" colspan="2" |
|-
| style="text-align:right;background-color:#FFFFFF;" colspan="2" |Total rejected, unmarked and declined votes
| style="text-align:right;background-color:#FFFFFF;" | 372
| style="text-align:right;background-color:#FFFFFF;" | 2.52
| style="text-align:right;background-color:#c2c2c2;" colspan="2" |
|-
| style="text-align:right;background-color:#FFFFFF;" colspan="2" |Turnout
| style="text-align:right;background-color:#FFFFFF;" | 14,784
| style="text-align:right;background-color:#FFFFFF;" | 51.27
| style="text-align:right;background-color:#FFFFFF;" | -0.86
| style="text-align:right;background-color:#c2c2c2;" |
|-
| style="text-align:right;background-color:#FFFFFF;" colspan="2" |Eligible voters
| style="text-align:right;background-color:#FFFFFF;" | 28,834
| style="text-align:right;background-color:#c2c2c2;" colspan="3" |
|-
| style="text-align:left;" colspan="6" |Note: Candidate campaign colours are based on the prominent colour used in campaign items (signs, literature, etc.)and are used as a visual differentiation between candidates.
|-
| style="text-align:left;" colspan="13" |Sources:
|}

Alta Vista Ward
Incumbent city councillor Jean Cloutier was re-elected in 2018 with 32.81% of the vote. He did not seek re-election.

Nominated candidates
Marty Carr, former president of the Alta Vista community association
Carolyn Kropp, executive assistant to Ottawa South MPP John Fraser
Bob Perkins, vice president of real estate advisory at Deloitte Canada
Angelo Gino Scaffidi

Results

|-
! rowspan="2" colspan="2"|Candidate
! colspan="3"|Popular vote
! rowspan="2" colspan="2"|Expenditures
|-
! Votes
! %
! ±%
|-
| style="background-color:#008080;" |
| style="text-align:left;"  | Marty Carr
| style="text-align:right;" | 6,088
| style="text-align:right;" | 47.12
| style="text-align:right;" |
| style="text-align:right;" |
|-
| style="background-color:#0E1D62;" |
| style="text-align:left;"  | Carolyn Kropp
| style="text-align:right;" | 4,107
| style="text-align:right;" | 31.79
| style="text-align:right;" |
| style="text-align:right;" |
|-
| style="background-color:#c63a3d;" |
| style="text-align:left;"  | Bob Perkins
| style="text-align:right;" | 2,453
| style="text-align:right;" | 18.99
| style="text-align:right;" |
| style="text-align:right;" |
|-
| style="background-color:#09081a;" |
| style="text-align:left;"  | Angelo Gino Scaffidi
| style="text-align:right;" | 271
| style="text-align:right;" | 2.10
| style="text-align:right;" |
| style="text-align:right;" |
|-
| style="text-align:right;background-color:#FFFFFF;" colspan="2" |Total valid votes
| style="text-align:right;background-color:#FFFFFF;" | 12,919
| style="text-align:right;background-color:#FFFFFF;" | 96.70
| style="text-align:right;background-color:#c2c2c2;" colspan="2" |
|-
| style="text-align:right;background-color:#FFFFFF;" colspan="2" |Total rejected, unmarked and declined votes
| style="text-align:right;background-color:#FFFFFF;" | 441
| style="text-align:right;background-color:#FFFFFF;" | 3.30
| style="text-align:right;background-color:#c2c2c2;" colspan="2" |
|-
| style="text-align:right;background-color:#FFFFFF;" colspan="2" |Turnout
| style="text-align:right;background-color:#FFFFFF;" | 13,360
| style="text-align:right;background-color:#FFFFFF;" | 43.09
| style="text-align:right;background-color:#FFFFFF;" | +1.36
| style="text-align:right;background-color:#c2c2c2;" |
|-
| style="text-align:right;background-color:#FFFFFF;" colspan="2" |Eligible voters
| style="text-align:right;background-color:#FFFFFF;" | 31,008
| style="text-align:right;background-color:#c2c2c2;" colspan="3" |
|-
| style="text-align:left;" colspan="6" |Note: Candidate campaign colours are based on the prominent colour used in campaign items (signs, literature, etc.)and are used as a visual differentiation between candidates.
|-
| style="text-align:left;" colspan="13" |Sources:
|}

Orléans South—Navan Ward
Incumbent city councillor Catherine Kitts was elected to the seat in a by-election on October 5, 2020, with 54.44% of the vote after her predecessor, Stephen Blais, was elected as Member of Provincial Parliament for Orléans on February 27, 2020. She ran again seeking a full-term and was re-elected.

Nominated candidates
Yvette Ashiri, 2020 Cumberland Ward by-election candidate
Catherine Kitts, incumbent city councillor
Shamsa Sheikh Ahmed

Results

|-
! rowspan="2" colspan="2"|Candidate
! colspan="3"|Popular vote
! rowspan="2" colspan="2"|Expenditures
|-
! Votes
! %
! ±%
|-
| style="background-color:#1f225d;" |
| style="text-align:left;"  | Catherine Kitts (X)
| style="text-align:right;" | 9,466
| style="text-align:right;" | 76.47
| style="text-align:right;" | +22.03
| style="text-align:right;" |
|-
| style="background-color:#50004A;" |
| style="text-align:left;"  | Yvette Ashiri
| style="text-align:right;" | 2,716
| style="text-align:right;" | 21.94
| style="text-align:right;" | +0.02
| style="text-align:right;" |
|-
| style="background-color:#FFFFFF;" |
| style="text-align:left;"  | Shamsa Sheikh Ahmed
| style="text-align:right;" | 196
| style="text-align:right;" | 1.58
| style="text-align:right;" |
| style="text-align:right;" |
|-
| style="text-align:right;background-color:#FFFFFF;" colspan="2" |Total valid votes
| style="text-align:right;background-color:#FFFFFF;" | 12,378
| style="text-align:right;background-color:#FFFFFF;" | 98.57
| style="text-align:right;background-color:#c2c2c2;" colspan="2" |
|-
| style="text-align:right;background-color:#FFFFFF;" colspan="2" |Total rejected, unmarked and declined votes
| style="text-align:right;background-color:#FFFFFF;" | 180
| style="text-align:right;background-color:#FFFFFF;" | 1.43
| style="text-align:right;background-color:#c2c2c2;" colspan="2" |
|-
| style="text-align:right;background-color:#FFFFFF;" colspan="2" |Turnout
| style="text-align:right;background-color:#FFFFFF;" | 12,558
| style="text-align:right;background-color:#FFFFFF;" | 39.22
| style="text-align:right;background-color:#FFFFFF;" | +1.22
| style="text-align:right;background-color:#c2c2c2;" |
|-
| style="text-align:right;background-color:#FFFFFF;" colspan="2" |Eligible voters
| style="text-align:right;background-color:#FFFFFF;" | 32,023
| style="text-align:right;background-color:#c2c2c2;" colspan="3" |
|-
| style="text-align:left;" colspan="6" |Note: Candidate campaign colours are based on the prominent colour used in campaign items (signs, literature, etc.)and are used as a visual differentiation between candidates.
|-
| style="text-align:left;" colspan="13" |Sources:
|}

Osgoode Ward
Incumbent city councillor George Darouze was re-elected in 2018 with 54.86% of the vote. He ran again and was re-elected by a close margin.

Nominated candidates
George Darouze, incumbent city councillor
Bruce Anthony Faulkner, 2014 and 2018 provincial Libertarian candidate in Ottawa Centre, candidate for Kanata South in 2014
Bob Masaro, candidate for this ward in 2010 and 2014
Dan O'Brien
Doug Thompson, former city councillor for Osgoode Ward

Results

|-
! rowspan="2" colspan="2"|Candidate
! colspan="3"|Popular vote
! rowspan="2" colspan="2"|Expenditures
|-
! Votes
! %
! ±%
|-
| style="background-color:#F8C623;" |
| style="text-align:left;"  | George Darouze (X)
| style="text-align:right;" | 4,353
| style="text-align:right;" | 40.81
| style="text-align:right;" | -14.05
| style="text-align:right;" |
|-
| style="background-color:#010195;" |
| style="text-align:left;"  | Doug Thompson
| style="text-align:right;" | 4,115
| style="text-align:right;" | 38.58
| style="text-align:right;" |
| style="text-align:right;" |
|-
| style="background-color:#111611;" |
| style="text-align:left;"  | Dan O'Brien
| style="text-align:right;" | 1,541
| style="text-align:right;" | 14.45
| style="text-align:right;" |
| style="text-align:right;" |
|-
| style="background-color:#411d5e;" |
| style="text-align:left;"  | Bob Masaro
| style="text-align:right;" | 432
| style="text-align:right;" | 4.05
| style="text-align:right;" |
| style="text-align:right;" |
|-
| style="background-color:#B52E2E;" |
| style="text-align:left;"  | Bruce Anthony Faulkner
| style="text-align:right;" | 226
| style="text-align:right;" | 2.12
| style="text-align:right;" |
| style="text-align:right;" |
|-
| style="text-align:right;background-color:#FFFFFF;" colspan="2" |Total valid votes
| style="text-align:right;background-color:#FFFFFF;" | 10,667
| style="text-align:right;background-color:#FFFFFF;" | 98.95
| style="text-align:right;background-color:#c2c2c2;" colspan="2" |
|-
| style="text-align:right;background-color:#FFFFFF;" colspan="2" |Total rejected, unmarked and declined votes
| style="text-align:right;background-color:#FFFFFF;" | 113
| style="text-align:right;background-color:#FFFFFF;" | 1.05
| style="text-align:right;background-color:#c2c2c2;" colspan="2" |
|-
| style="text-align:right;background-color:#FFFFFF;" colspan="2" |Turnout
| style="text-align:right;background-color:#FFFFFF;" | 10,780
| style="text-align:right;background-color:#FFFFFF;" | 46.16
| style="text-align:right;background-color:#FFFFFF;" | +0.32
| style="text-align:right;background-color:#c2c2c2;" |
|-
| style="text-align:right;background-color:#FFFFFF;" colspan="2" |Eligible voters
| style="text-align:right;background-color:#FFFFFF;" | 23,354
| style="text-align:right;background-color:#c2c2c2;" colspan="3" |
|-
| style="text-align:left;" colspan="6" |Note: Candidate campaign colours are based on the prominent colour used in campaign items (signs, literature, etc.)and are used as a visual differentiation between candidates.
|-
| style="text-align:left;" colspan="13" |Sources:
|}

Rideau—Jock Ward
Incumbent city councillor Scott Moffatt was re-elected in 2018 with 55.81% of the vote. He did not seek re-election.

Nominated candidates
David Brown, political staffer, former assistant to incumbent councillor Scott Moffatt, former president of the Richmond Agricultural Society, and candidate for this ward in 2018
Leigh-Andrea Brunet, businesswoman and educator
Michael J. Nowak, President and CEO at CODE Incorporated
Patty Searl, CEO of Clean POV Ottawa
Kevin Setia

Results

|-
! rowspan="2" colspan="2"|Candidate
! colspan="3"|Popular vote
! rowspan="2" colspan="2"|Expenditures
|-
! Votes
! %
! ±%
|-
| style="background-color:#F8EF00;" |
| style="text-align:left;"  | David Brown
| style="text-align:right;" | 6,901
| style="text-align:right;" | 66.64
| style="text-align:right;" | +22.45
| style="text-align:right;" |
|-
| style="background-color:#616B63;" |
| style="text-align:left;"  | Leigh-Andrea Brunet
| style="text-align:right;" | 1,654
| style="text-align:right;" | 15.97
| style="text-align:right;" |
| style="text-align:right;" |
|-
| style="background-color:#2A2829;" |
| style="text-align:left;"  | Kevin Setia
| style="text-align:right;" | 1,201
| style="text-align:right;" | 11.60
| style="text-align:right;" |
| style="text-align:right;" |
|-
| style="background-color:#b0947c;" |
| style="text-align:left;"  | Patty Searl
| style="text-align:right;" | 349
| style="text-align:right;" | 3.37
| style="text-align:right;" |
| style="text-align:right;" |
|-
| style="background-color:#FFFFFF;" |
| style="text-align:left;"  | Michael J. Nowak
| style="text-align:right;" | 251
| style="text-align:right;" | 2.42
| style="text-align:right;" |
| style="text-align:right;" |
|-
| style="text-align:right;background-color:#FFFFFF;" colspan="2" |Total valid votes
| style="text-align:right;background-color:#FFFFFF;" | 10,356
| style="text-align:right;background-color:#FFFFFF;" | 98.03
| style="text-align:right;background-color:#c2c2c2;" colspan="2" |
|-
| style="text-align:right;background-color:#FFFFFF;" colspan="2" |Total rejected, unmarked and declined votes
| style="text-align:right;background-color:#FFFFFF;" | 208
| style="text-align:right;background-color:#FFFFFF;" | 1.97
| style="text-align:right;background-color:#c2c2c2;" colspan="2" |
|-
| style="text-align:right;background-color:#FFFFFF;" colspan="2" |Turnout
| style="text-align:right;background-color:#FFFFFF;" | 10,564
| style="text-align:right;background-color:#FFFFFF;" | 48.09
| style="text-align:right;background-color:#FFFFFF;" | +1.89
| style="text-align:right;background-color:#c2c2c2;" |
|-
| style="text-align:right;background-color:#FFFFFF;" colspan="2" |Eligible voters
| style="text-align:right;background-color:#FFFFFF;" | 21,966
| style="text-align:right;background-color:#c2c2c2;" colspan="3" |
|-
| style="text-align:left;" colspan="6" |Note: Candidate campaign colours are based on the prominent colour used in campaign items (signs, literature, etc.)and are used as a visual differentiation between candidates.
|-
| style="text-align:left;" colspan="13" |Sources:
|}

Riverside South—Findlay Creek Ward
Incumbent city councillor Carol Anne Meehan was elected in 2018 with 42.55% of the vote. She initially announced she was running for re-election in the new Barrhaven East Ward, but later announced she was not running for re-election.

Nominated candidates
Zainab Alsalihiy
Steve Desroches, former city councillor
Salah Elsaadi
Em McLellan

Results

|-
! rowspan="2" colspan="2"|Candidate
! colspan="3"|Popular vote
! rowspan="2" colspan="2"|Expenditures
|-
! Votes
! %
! ±%
|-
| style="background-color:#f3cf17;" |
| style="text-align:left;"  | Steve Desroches
| style="text-align:right;" | 5,682
| style="text-align:right;" | 67.89
| style="text-align:right;" |
| style="text-align:right;" |
|-
| style="background-color:#1e2025;" |
| style="text-align:left;"  | Zainab Alsalihiy
| style="text-align:right;" | 1,533
| style="text-align:right;" | 18.32
| style="text-align:right;" |
| style="text-align:right;" |
|-
| style="background-color:#2f3192;" |
| style="text-align:left;"  | Salah Elsaadi
| style="text-align:right;" | 900
| style="text-align:right;" | 10.75
| style="text-align:right;" |
| style="text-align:right;" |
|-
| style="background-color:#FFFFFF;" |
| style="text-align:left;"  | Em McLellan
| style="text-align:right;" | 255
| style="text-align:right;" | 3.05
| style="text-align:right;" |
| style="text-align:right;" |
|-
| style="text-align:right;background-color:#FFFFFF;" colspan="2" |Total valid votes
| style="text-align:right;background-color:#FFFFFF;" | 8,370
| style="text-align:right;background-color:#FFFFFF;" | 98.47
| style="text-align:right;background-color:#c2c2c2;" colspan="2" |
|-
| style="text-align:right;background-color:#FFFFFF;" colspan="2" |Total rejected, unmarked and declined votes
| style="text-align:right;background-color:#FFFFFF;" | 130
| style="text-align:right;background-color:#FFFFFF;" | 1.53
| style="text-align:right;background-color:#c2c2c2;" colspan="2" |
|-
| style="text-align:right;background-color:#FFFFFF;" colspan="2" |Turnout
| style="text-align:right;background-color:#FFFFFF;" | 8,500
| style="text-align:right;background-color:#FFFFFF;" | 42.88
| style="text-align:right;background-color:#FFFFFF;" | -3.21
| style="text-align:right;background-color:#c2c2c2;" |
|-
| style="text-align:right;background-color:#FFFFFF;" colspan="2" |Eligible voters
| style="text-align:right;background-color:#FFFFFF;" | 19,822
| style="text-align:right;background-color:#c2c2c2;" colspan="3" |
|-
| style="text-align:left;" colspan="6" |Note: Candidate campaign colours are based on the prominent colour used in campaign items (signs, literature, etc.)and are used as a visual differentiation between candidates.
|-
| style="text-align:left;" colspan="13" |Sources:
|}

Kanata South Ward
Incumbent city councillor Allan Hubley was re-elected in 2018 with 45.53% of the vote. He ran again and was re-elected.

Nominated candidates
Erin Coffin, senior advisor at Health Canada
Mike Dawson
Rouba Fattal, public servant
Allan Hubley, incumbent city councillor
Bina Shah, teacher

Results

|-
! rowspan="2" colspan="2"|Candidate
! colspan="3"|Popular vote
! rowspan="2" colspan="2"|Expenditures
|-
! Votes
! %
! ±%
|-
| style="background-color:#0d254f;" |
| style="text-align:left;"  | Allan Hubley (X)
| style="text-align:right;" | 5,334
| style="text-align:right;" | 33.86
| style="text-align:right;" | -11.67
| style="text-align:right;" |
|-
| style="background-color:#3F1D58;" |
| style="text-align:left;"  | Erin Coffin
| style="text-align:right;" | 3,611
| style="text-align:right;" | 22.92
| style="text-align:right;" |
| style="text-align:right;" |
|-
| style="background-color:#1DA1F2;" |
| style="text-align:left;"  | Rouba Fattal
| style="text-align:right;" | 3,606
| style="text-align:right;" | 22.89
| style="text-align:right;" |
| style="text-align:right;" |
|-
| style="background-color:#0474BC;" |
| style="text-align:left;"  | Mike Dawson
| style="text-align:right;" | 1,782
| style="text-align:right;" | 11.31
| style="text-align:right;" |
| style="text-align:right;" |
|-
| style="background-color:#CEAF83;" |
| style="text-align:left;"  | Bina Shah
| style="text-align:right;" | 1,422
| style="text-align:right;" |  9.03
| style="text-align:right;" |
| style="text-align:right;" |
|-
| style="text-align:right;background-color:#FFFFFF;" colspan="2" |Total valid votes
| style="text-align:right;background-color:#FFFFFF;" | 15,755
| style="text-align:right;background-color:#FFFFFF;" | 99.14
| style="text-align:right;background-color:#c2c2c2;" colspan="2" |
|-
| style="text-align:right;background-color:#FFFFFF;" colspan="2" |Total rejected, unmarked and declined votes
| style="text-align:right;background-color:#FFFFFF;" | 137
| style="text-align:right;background-color:#FFFFFF;" | 0.86
| style="text-align:right;background-color:#c2c2c2;" colspan="2" |
|-
| style="text-align:right;background-color:#FFFFFF;" colspan="2" |Turnout
| style="text-align:right;background-color:#FFFFFF;" | 15,892
| style="text-align:right;background-color:#FFFFFF;" | 44.04
| style="text-align:right;background-color:#FFFFFF;" | +2.62
| style="text-align:right;background-color:#c2c2c2;" |
|-
| style="text-align:right;background-color:#FFFFFF;" colspan="2" |Eligible voters
| style="text-align:right;background-color:#FFFFFF;" | 36,085
| style="text-align:right;background-color:#c2c2c2;" colspan="3" |
|-
| style="text-align:left;" colspan="6" |Note: Candidate campaign colours are based on the prominent colour used in campaign items (signs, literature, etc.)and are used as a visual differentiation between candidates.
|-
| style="text-align:left;" colspan="13" |Sources:
|}

Barrhaven East Ward
The Barrhaven East Ward was newly created for the 2022 election following redistricting. Incumbent city councillor Carol Anne Meehan initially announced she was running for re-election in the new Barrhaven East Ward, but later announced she was not running for re-election.

Nominated candidates
Guy Boone
Patrick Brennan, information security specialist
Kathleen Caught, retired financial consultant
Richard Garrick, teacher
Dominik Janelle, Carleton University student
Wilson Lo, city employee and former bus operator
Atiq Qureshi

Results

|-
! rowspan="2" colspan="2"|Candidate
! colspan="3"|Popular vote
! rowspan="2" colspan="2"|Expenditures
|-
! Votes
! %
! ±%
|-
| style="background-color:#FFD966;" |
| style="text-align:left;"  | Wilson Lo
| style="text-align:right;" | 4,403
| style="text-align:right;" | 36.82
| style="text-align:right;" |
| style="text-align:right;" |
|-
| style="background-color:#7BB5B2;" |
| style="text-align:left;"  | Richard Garrick
| style="text-align:right;" | 2,980
| style="text-align:right;" | 24.92
| style="text-align:right;" |
| style="text-align:right;" |
|-
| style="background-color:#49606E;" |
| style="text-align:left;"  | Patrick Brennan
| style="text-align:right;" | 2,153
| style="text-align:right;" | 18.00
| style="text-align:right;" |
| style="text-align:right;" |
|-
| style="background-color:#5f4ac1;" |
| style="text-align:left;"  | Kathleen Caught
| style="text-align:right;" | 888
| style="text-align:right;" | 7.43
| style="text-align:right;" |
| style="text-align:right;" |
|-
| style="background-color:#f8ece4;" |
| style="text-align:left;"  | Atiq Qureshi
| style="text-align:right;" | 778
| style="text-align:right;" | 6.51
| style="text-align:right;" |
| style="text-align:right;" |
|-
| style="background-color:#0874a2;" |
| style="text-align:left;"  | Guy Boone
| style="text-align:right;" | 516
| style="text-align:right;" | 4.32
| style="text-align:right;" |
| style="text-align:right;" |
|-
| style="background-color:#F5B341;" |
| style="text-align:left;"  | Dominik Janelle
| style="text-align:right;" | 240
| style="text-align:right;" | 2.01
| style="text-align:right;" |
| style="text-align:right;" |
|-
| style="text-align:right;background-color:#FFFFFF;" colspan="2" |Total valid votes
| style="text-align:right;background-color:#FFFFFF;" | 11,958
| style="text-align:right;background-color:#FFFFFF;" | 97.66
| style="text-align:right;background-color:#c2c2c2;" colspan="2" |
|-
| style="text-align:right;background-color:#FFFFFF;" colspan="2" |Total rejected, unmarked and declined votes
| style="text-align:right;background-color:#FFFFFF;" | 286
| style="text-align:right;background-color:#FFFFFF;" | 2.34
| style="text-align:right;background-color:#c2c2c2;" colspan="2" |
|-
| style="text-align:right;background-color:#FFFFFF;" colspan="2" |Turnout
| style="text-align:right;background-color:#FFFFFF;" | 12,244
| style="text-align:right;background-color:#FFFFFF;" | 39.11
| style="text-align:right;background-color:#FFFFFF;" |
| style="text-align:right;background-color:#c2c2c2;" |
|-
| style="text-align:right;background-color:#FFFFFF;" colspan="2" |Eligible voters
| style="text-align:right;background-color:#FFFFFF;" | 31,307
| style="text-align:right;background-color:#c2c2c2;" colspan="3" |
|-
| style="text-align:left;" colspan="6" |Note: Candidate campaign colours are based on the prominent colour used in campaign items (signs, literature, etc.)and are used as a visual differentiation between candidates.
|-
| style="text-align:left;" colspan="13" |Sources:
|}

Endorsements

Barrhaven West

West Carleton-March

Stittsville Ward

Bay Ward

College Ward

Knoxdale-Merivale Ward

Gloucester-Southgate Ward

Rideau-Vanier Ward

Rideau-Rockcliffe Ward

Somerset Ward

Capital Ward

Orléans South—Navan Ward

Rideau-Jock Ward

Kanata South Ward

School Board

Boards

Ottawa Catholic School Board

Zone 1
Incumbent trustee Mardi de Kemp was appointed to the seat on March 29, 2022, after her predecessor, John Curry, died on February 5, 2022. She will be seeking election to a full term.

Nominated candidates
Jeff Darwin
Mardi de Kemp, incumbent trustee
Scott Phelan

Zone 2
Incumbent trustee Sandra Moore was re-elected in 2018 with 69.53% of the vote. She will be seeking re-election.

Nominated candidates
Sandra Moore, incumbent trustee
Alex Sithole

Zone 3
Incumbent trustee Brian Coburn was re-elected by acclamation in 2018. He will be seeking re-election.

Nominated candidates
Brian Coburn, incumbent trustee
Marguerite Gravelle
Paul Safi

Zone 4
Incumbent trustee Spencer Warren was re-elected by acclamation in 2018. He will be seeking re-election.

Nominated candidates
Nicolas Caravaggio
Greg Hopkins
Spencer Warren, incumbent trustee

Zone 5
Incumbent trustee Joanne MacEwan was re-elected by acclamation in 2018. She will be seeking re-election.

Nominated candidates
Marc Bélisle
Joanne MacEwan, incumbent trustee

Zone 6
Incumbent trustee Glen Armstrong was elected in 2018 with 54.59% of the vote. He will be seeking re-election.

Nominated candidates
Glen Armstrong, incumbent trustee
Melissa Fraser-Arnott
Eugene Milito, former principal of St. Nicholas Adult High School
Patrick Suwalski

Zone 7
Incumbent trustee Jeremy Wittet was re-elected by acclamation in 2018. He will be seeking re-election.

Nominated candidates
Danny Arrais
Jeremy Wittett, incumbent trustee

Zone 8
Incumbent trustee Mark D. Mullan was re-elected by acclamation in 2018. He will be seeking re-election.

Nominated candidates
Mark Mullan, incumbent trustee
Christopher Andrew John Kelly

Zone 9
Incumbent trustee Shelley Lawrence was elected in 2018 with 82.92% of the vote. She will be seeking re-election.

Nominated candidates
Guillermo Fernandez
Shelley Lawrence, incumbent trustee
Jenny Rivera

Zone 10
Incumbent trustee Cindy Simpson was appointed to the seat on February 12, 2019, after her predecessor, Thérèse Maloney-Cousineau, died on January 11, 2019. She will be seeking election to a full term.

Nominated candidates
Cameron Bonesso, university student and president of Ottawa-based consulting firm Constituent Manager Solutions
Cindy Desclouds-Simpson, appointed incumbent trustee

Ottawa-Carleton District School Board

In 2022, the OCDSB responded to the City of Ottawa's ward boundary realignment by redistricting its trustee Zones. Following consultation, trustees made amendments to their zones, specifically:

Zone 1 - West Carleton-March/Stittsville/Rideau-Jock
Incumbent trustee Lynn Scott was re-elected in 2018 with 64.84% of the vote. She will be seeking re-election.

Nominated candidates
Jonathon Salinas, public servant
Lynn Scott, incumbent trustee
Gananatha Subrahmanyam, professor at the University of Ottawa

Zone 2 - Kanata North/Kanata South
Incumbent trustee Christine Boothby was re-elected in 2018 with 66.34% of the vote. She did not file to run for re-election.

Nominated candidates
Alysha Aziz
Ashley Darling
Thomas deGroot, legislative assistant to Progressive Conservative MPP Merrilee Fullerton, former regional vice president for the Progressive Conservative Party of Ontario
Michael Edwards
Alastair Luft, writer
Alex Rochman, quality assurance specialist

Zone 3 - Barrhaven West/Barrhaven East
Incumbent trustee Donna Blackburn was re-elected in 2018 with 39.96% of the vote. She will be seeking re-election.

Nominated candidates
Donna Blackburn, incumbent trustee
Patricia Kmiec, human rights and social justice/sociology contract Professor at Carleton University
Natalie Rowe

Zone 4 - Bay/Kitchissippi
Incumbent trustee Wendy Hough was elected in 2018 with 66.65% of the vote. She did not file to run for re-election.

Nominated candidates
Rasha Alnaqeeb
Suzanne Nash, president of the Plant Pool Recreation Association
Kevin Wright

Zone 5 - College/Knoxdale-Merivale
Incumbent trustee Rob Campbell was elected in 2018 with 65.08% of the vote. He did not file to run for re-election.

Nominated candidates
Gemma Nicholson
Amanda Presley
Steven Warren, University of Ottawa student and provincial Green candidate in Ottawa West—Nepean in 2022

Zone 6 - Rideau-Vanier/Rideau-Rockcliffe
Incumbent trustee Chris Ellis was re-elected in 2018 with 48.28% of the vote. He did not file to run for re-election. The 2SLGBTQI+ community has criticized Shannon Boschy's candidacy due to his opposition to gender-affirming medical care for children and youth, which Boschy described as "the sterilization of vulnerable children in Canada."

Nominated candidates
Shannon Boschy, former high school teacher
Keith de Silvia-Legault, University of Ottawa student, former political staffer and charity fundraiser
Lyra Evans, incumbent trustee for Zone 9
Anthony Hope, operations coordinator
Jennifer Moroziuk
Ryan Ward

Zone 7 - Osgoode/Riverside South-Findlay Creek
Incumbent trustee Jennifer Jennekens was elected in 2018 with 52.74% of the vote. She will be seeking re-election.

Nominated candidates
Jennifer Jennekens, incumbent trustee and federal Conservative candidate in Ottawa West—Nepean in 2021
Maria Inam Khan

Zone 8 - Orléans East-Cumberland/Orléans South-Navan
Incumbent trustee Keith Penny was elected in 2018 with 55.13% of the vote. He did not file to run for re-election. The 2SLGBTQI+ community has criticized Chanel Pfahl's candidacy due to her opposition to gender-affirming medical care for children and youth, which she described as "a pseudoscientific concept which harms kids".

Nominated candidates
Donna Dickson
Shannon Kramer
Chanel Pfahl

Zone 9 - Capital/Alta-Vista
Incumbent trustee Lyra Evans was elected in 2018 with 55.33% of the vote. She will be running for re-election in Zone 6.

Nominated candidates
Nili Kaplan-Myrth, family doctor
Josh Rachlis, copywriter and perennial candidate
Jessie-Lee Wallace, communications professional and charity fundraiser

Zone 10 - Somerset
Incumbent trustee Justine Bell was appointed to the seat on February 12, 2020, after her predecessor, Erica Braunovan, resigned on December 4, 2019. She will be seeking a full term.

Nominated candidates
Justine Bell, incumbent trustee
John Bitzan

Zone 11 - River/Gloucester-Southgate
Incumbent trustee Mark Fisher was re-elected in 2018 with 50.42% of the vote. He did not file to run for re-election.

Nominated candidates
Mamata Dutta
Matthew Lee
Ryan St-Jean
Maher Jebara

Zone 12 - Orléans West-Innes/Beacon-Hill Cyrville
Incumbent trustee Sandra Schwartz was re-elected in 2018 with 74.31% of the vote. She did not file to run for re-election.
Nominated candidates
Sandra Griffith-Bonaparte, public servant, and president of Local 70607 of the Public Service Alliance of Canada
Peter Heyck, 2018 candidate for City Council in Rideau-Rockcliffe Ward
Cathryne Milburn

Conseil des écoles catholiques du Centre-Est

The Conseil des écoles catholiques du Centre-Est (CECCE)'s boundaries for Zones 1, 2, and 3 are outside of Ottawa, and are thus not included on this list.

Zone 4
Incumbent trustee Jolène Savoie-Day was elected in 2018 with 66.80% of the vote. She will be seeking re-election.

Nominated candidates
Jolène Savoie-Day, incumbent trustee

Zone 5
Incumbent trustee Chad Mariage was re-elected by acclamation in 2018. He will be seeking re-election.

Nominated candidates
Claude Lalonde
Chad Mariage, incumbent trustee

Zone 6
Incumbent trustee Valérie Assoi was elected by acclamation in 2018. She did not file to run for re-election.

Nominated candidates
Franklin Epape
Denis Forget

Zone 7
Incumbent trustee Robert Rainboth was elected by acclamation in 2018. He will be seeking re-election.

Nominated candidates
Robert Rainboth, incumbent trustee

Zone 8
Incumbent trustee Dan Boudria was re-elected in 2018 with 79.15% of the vote. He will be seeking re-election.

Nominated candidates
Dan Boudria, incumbent trustee

Zone 9
Incumbent trustee Johanne Lacombe was re-elected by acclamation in 2018. She will be seeking re-election.

Nominated candidates
Johanne Lacombe, incumbent trustee

Zone 10
Incumbent trustee Monique Briand was re-elected by acclamation in 2018. She will be running for re-election.

Nominated candidates
Léo Cardinal
Monique Briand, incumbent trustee

Zone 11
Incumbent trustee André Thibodeau was elected by acclamation in 2018. He will be seeking re-election.

Nominated candidates
André Thibodeau, incumbent trustee

Conseil des écoles publiques de l'Est de l'Ontario

The Conseil des écoles publiques de l'Est de l'Ontario (CEPEO)'s boundaries for Zones 1, 2, 3, 4, and 5 are outside of Ottawa, and are thus not included on this list.

Zone 6
Incumbent trustee Roda Muse was elected by acclamation in 2018. She did not file to run for re-election.

Nominated candidates
Marc Roy, incumbent trustee for Zone 8

Zone 7
Incumbent trustee Denis M. Chartrand was re-elected in 2018 with 73.79% of the vote. He did not file to run for re-election.

Nominated candidates
Nenette Ntema-Mbudi
Philippe Landry

Zone 8
Incumbent trustee Marc Roy was re-elected by acclamation in 2018. He has indicated that he will be seeking re-election in Zone 6.

Nominated candidates
Denis Labrèche, 2020 Cumberland Ward by-election candidate, President of the Carlsbad Springs Community Association and director of CJRO-FM
Annila Tharakan

Zone 9
Incumbent trustee Marielle Godbout was re-elected in 2018 with 79.34% of the vote. She will be seeking re-election.

Nominated candidates
Joël Beddows
Mahdi Djama Aouled
Marielle Godbout, incumbent trustee

Zone 10
Incumbent trustee Warsama Abdourahman Aden was appointed to the seat on September 23, 2020, after his predecessor, Lucille Collard, was elected as Member of Provincial Parliament for Ottawa—Vanier on February 27, 2020. He will be seeking election to a full term.

Nominated candidates
Warsama Aden, incumbent trustee
Joseph-Alphonse André
Sonia Boudreault

Zone 11
Incumbent trustee Jacinthe Marcil was elected in 2018 with 43.87% of the vote. She will be seeking re-election.

Nominated candidates
Jacinthe Marcil, incumbent trustee

Zone 12
Incumbent trustee Samia Ouled Ali was elected in 2018 with 50.99% of the vote. She will be seeking re-election.

Nominated candidates
Samia Ouled Ali, incumbent trustee

Endorsements

OCDSB Zone 2 - Kanata North/Kanata South

OCDSB Zone 3 - Barrhaven West/Barrhaven East

OCDSB Zone 4 - Bay/Kitchissippi

OCDSB Zone 5 - College/Knoxdale-Merivale

OCDSB Zone 6 - Rideau-Vanier/Rideau-Rockcliffe

OCDSB Zone 9 - Capital/Alta-Vista

OCDSB Zone 10 - Somerset

OCDSB Zone 11 - River/Gloucester-Southgate

Third-party advertisers

Campaign Life Coalition
The Campaign Life Coalition is a Canadian political lobbyist organization that advocates for socially conservative values. Campaign Life Coalition opposes abortion, euthanasia, embryonic stem cell research, IVF, same-sex marriage, and transgender rights legislation.
Date registered: Sept 9, 2022
Organization website: 
Mayoral Endorsements: Mike Maguire, Ade Olumide, and Bernard Couchman
City Council Endorsements:
College Ward - Vilteau Delvas
Knoxdale-Merivale Ward - Joseph Ben-Ami
Rideau-Vanier Ward - Tyler Cybulski
Rideau-Jock Ward - Michael J. Nowak
OCDSB Trustee Endorsements:
Zone 2 - Kanata North/Kanata South - Ashley Darling
Zone 4 - Bay/Kitchissippi - Rasha Alnaqeeb
Zone 6 - Rideau-Vanier/Rideau-Rockcliffe -  Shannon Boschy
Zone 11 - River/Gloucester-Southgate - Matthew Lee & Maher Jebara

Horizon Ottawa
Horizon Ottawa is a progressive community organization that advocates for progressive policies and more progressive elected representatives.
Date registered: August 24, 2022
Mayoral Endorsement: Catherine McKenneyCity Council Endorsements:Orléans East-Cumberland Ward - Tessa FranklinOrléans West-Innes Ward - Lori StinsonStittsville Ward - Kevin HuaCollege Ward - Laine JohnsonKnoxdale-Merivale Ward - Sean DevineRideau-Vanier Ward - Laura ShantzSomerset Ward - Ariel TrosterKitchissippi Ward - Jeff LeiperRiver Ward - Ethan SabourinCapital Ward - Shawn MenardOrléans South-Navan Ward - Yvette AshiriOCDSB Trustee Endorsements:Zone 2 - Kanata North/Kanata South - Alysha AzizZone 3 - Barrhaven West/Barrhaven East - Patricia KmiecZone 4 - Bay/Kitchissippi - Suzanne NashZone 5 - College/Knoxdale-Merivale - Steven WarrenZone 6 - Rideau-Vanier/Rideau-Rockcliffe - Lyra EvansZone 9 - Capital/Alta Vista - Jessie-Lee Wallace & Nili Kaplan-MyrthZone 10 - Somerset''' - Justine Bell

Notes

References

External links 

 Ottawa City Hall election resources

Election, 2022
Ottawa
Municipal elections in Ottawa